The Venezuelan motorcycle Grand Prix is a motorcycling event that was part of the Grand Prix motorcycle racing season from 1977 to 1979,

Winners of the Venezuelan motorcycle Grand Prix

Multiple winners (riders)

Multiple winners (manufacturers)

By year

References

 

 
Recurring sporting events established in 1977
Recurring sporting events disestablished in 1979
1977 establishments in Venezuela
1979 disestablishments in South America